The Toyota Tacoma is a pickup truck manufactured by the Japanese automobile manufacturer Toyota since 1995. The first-generation Tacoma (model years 1995 through 2004) was classified as a compact pickup. The second generation (model years 2005 through 2015) and third generation (in production since 2015) models are classified as mid-sized pickups. The Tacoma was Motor Trends Truck of the Year for 2005.

As of 2015, the Tacoma was sold in the United States, Canada, Mexico, Costa Rica, Bolivia, Bermuda, and the French overseas collectivity of New Caledonia. Most markets across the world receive the Toyota Hilux in lieu of the Tacoma.

The name "Tacoma" was derived from the Coast Salish peoples' name for Mount Rainier in the U.S. state of Washington.



First generation (N140/N150/N160/N170/N190; 1995) 

The Tacoma was introduced in the US in February 1995 (March 1995 market launch) as a replacement for the Toyota Pickup, the name used for the Hilux in the North American market. Compared with the Hilux, the Tacoma is engineered with a greater priority on ride quality, handling, comfort, and safety over ruggedness and payload capacity. The design is intended to better suit the needs of the US and Canadian market, where pickup trucks are often used as personal vehicles, and less exclusively for commercial, agricultural, and off-road use.

Development
Development began in 1989, following the launch of the fifth-generation Toyota Pickup in late 1988 and concluded in 1994. Design work was done at Calty Design Research in California from 1990 to 1992, when Kevin Hunter's exterior design proposal was chosen in the autumn of 1991 and in final form, frozen for production in 1992. Patents for the production design were filed in Japan in April 1993 and October 28, 1993, in the United States.

Technical
Three engines were available for the Tacoma: 

Notes

Two-wheel drive (2WD) Tacomas (excluding PreRunner models) had five-stud wheel-lug patterns and either the 2.4-L or 3.4-L engine. Four-wheel drive (4WD) and PreRunner Tacomas had six-stud wheel-lug patterns and were available with either the 2.7-L or 3.4-L engine. Initially, the 2.4 L was limited to the 2WD models (both regular and Xtracab), while the 2.7 L was the standard engine for 4WD models, and the 3.4 L V6, shared with the larger T100 truck, was an option for the 2WD (Xtracab only) and 4WD (regular and Xtracab). The top-of-the-line SR5 trim was available for the 4WD Xtracab V6. From 1997 on, the 3.4 L V6 was dropped as an option for the regular cab models, which were available only with a 2.4-L or a 2.7-L four-cylinder engine.

The V6 supercharger kit was specified for model years 1997 and later, as the earlier engine control units (ECUs) had limitations. In addition, TRD supercharger kits were available for the 4-cylinder engines (2.4 L and 2.7 L) as well.

A five-speed manual transmission was standard for all models initially, with a four-speed automatic transmission available as an option except for the 4WD V6 regular cab. The PreRunner (MY98–04) and Double Cab (01–04) models were available only with an automatic transmission for the first generation. The 3.4 L V6 was paired with the R150F manual transmission or the A340F (4WD) or A340E (2WD) Aisin automatic transmission; the A340F code is 30-40LE.

The first-generation Tacoma has a fully-boxed frame (meaning the main frame rails have a closed rectangular cross-section) until immediately after the rear leaf spring mounting bracket, where the frame transitions into a C-shaped cross-section. The TRD Off-Road package was introduced in 1998. This package added a locking rear differential and was only available to PreRunner and four-wheel drive models that were equipped with the 3.4-L V6. Antilock brakes were made standard across the Tacoma line for the 2003 model year.

Updates
The first-generation Tacoma underwent its first minor update in October 1996, switching from recessed sealed beam headlamps to a flush design on 2WD models. There were two more cosmetic facelifts: the first in July 1997 and the second in October 2000. The most visible changes were in the modified front grilles (both facelifts, for model years 1998 and 2001) and tailgate badging and emblems (first facelift, MY1998). The MY1998 facelift included distinct grilles for the 2WD and 4WD models; 2WD models featured a prominent horizontal bar splitting the grille. A StepSide bed was added as an option for MY2000.

Mechanical changes included a switch to distributorless ignitions (coil-on-plug) in 1996 and in 1997 longer rear leaf springs. A passenger-side air bag was added in July 1997, and the driver's-side air bag (standard from 1995 launch) was "depowered". Most 4×4 models came with Toyota's Automatic Differential Disconnect system after the 2000 model year.

Variants
At its introduction as a model year 1995, Tacoma 4WD and 2WD models could be distinguished externally by the front grilles. The 4WD model had two heavy chrome bars flanking a trapezoidal opening, tapering toward the top, while the 2WD model had thinner bars (optionally chrome) with a trapezoidal shape tapering toward the bottom.

The PreRunner model was introduced for the 1998 model year. The PreRunner is a 2WD that shares the same taller suspension, six-lug wheel bolt pattern, and 2.7 L base engine as the four-wheel drive. Along with the four-wheel drive model, it was also available with the TRD Off-Road Package that included a locking rear differential, also introduced in 1998. A Regular Cab PreRunner was introduced in 1999.

Designed through 1998 (by Yusuke Fukushima) as part of the MY2001 facelift (patented on September 22, 1998, at Japan Patent Office under #0890798) was a new crew cab (four-door) model added to the lineup in October 2000. The crew cab, officially dubbed as the Double Cab model, featured four doors and Tokico gas shocks, while the extended cabs still opened with two doors and used Bilstein shocks. The extended cab featured a  bed, while the crew cab featured a  bed. Many customers were upset with small crew cab beds, but most competitors shared this shortcoming.

In October 2000, along with the front facelift, Toyota also unveiled the S-Runner trim package for the 2WD Xtracab that was available exclusively with the 3.4-liter V6 engine coupled to a five-speed manual transmission. The final drive ratio is 3.15:1. Visually, the S-Runner carried a monochrome finish, with a grille and other trim pieces colored to match the exterior in either Black Sand Pearl or Radiant Red. The overall height is reduced by approximately  through the use of low-profile P235/55R16 tires on  alloy wheels; additional suspension tuning features include Tokico gas shocks and front and rear anti-sway bars. Only 800 were produced each month from September 2000 to August 2004.

Sales and recalls

In its first few years of production, the Tacoma sold very well, attracting many young buyers. 

By 2003, the Tacoma had gained 16.5% sales from its previous years. The Tacoma's popularity only increased in the next few years. By 2004, it was ahead of the Nissan Frontier, and Dodge Dakota, but still 2.2% behind in sales to the Ford Ranger.

In 2008, Toyota proactively announced a 15-year, unlimited-mileage corrosion warranty for 1995–2000 model years due to inadequate rustproofing and frame corrosion issues affecting over 800,000 Tacomas. Toyota will either repair the frame or buy back the truck for 1.5 times its KBB retail value. This was later extended to include 2001–2004 model years, but in these cases when a frame was found to be rusty to the point of perforation, the frame is replaced with a new one instead of a buy back. It is suspected that inadequate drainage in the fully-boxed frame may have trapped moisture, leading to corrosion. The second-generation Tacoma moved to a frame with open C-section rails instead.

On November 21, 2012, Toyota recalled about 150,000 Tacoma midsize pickup trucks from the model years 2001 to 2004 that were sold primarily in 20 cold-weather U.S. states. The recall involves the spare tire and how it could fall off.

Second generation (N220/N240/N250/N260/N270; 2004) 

In 2000, Toyota began development of the second generation Tacoma under chief engineer Chikuo Kubota. The majority of development work was handled by Hino in Japan. Designers Shigeya Hattori and Hideo Karikomi of Hino, won the internal design competition in 2001. Final designs were frozen for production in 2002 and patents filed on July 3, 2003, with test mules being tested from early 2003. Prototypes were built later in 2003, with development ending in the second quarter of 2004.

On February 4, 2004, at the Chicago Auto Show, Toyota unveiled a bigger and more powerful Tacoma. Launched on October 18, 2004 as a 2005 model, this new Tacoma was available in eighteen different combinations of three cab configurations, four transmissions, two engines, and two bed lengths.

Updates
The 2006 model Tacoma was a bit different from the 2005 model. The 2006 model made some options standard. Toyota also added 2 new interior colors for the 2007 model year. 2008 models are carry-ons from 2007. For 2009 safety features were added and the Tacoma no longer offers a mechanical limited slip differential rather an open differential which uses individual wheel braking to simulate a mechanical LSD or "Auto-LSD".  TRD off-road models continue to come equipped with a locking rear differential.

A minor facelift came for 2009, including a slightly revised grille on some models, new LED taillamps, and on the X-Runner, TRD off-road and TRD Sport models includes a smoked headlamp trim. Auxiliary audio input now comes standard. The Access/Double Cab trucks have two new ceiling mounted speakers and an available backup monitor. Four new exterior colors are also added to the Tacoma.

The 2012 model year refresh featured a restyled front bumper, headlights, grille, hood, new interior and a shark fin antenna for the SiriusXM satellite radio. The 2013 model year comes with a touch screen audio system and removes the shark fin antenna and SiriusXM radio capability unless the optional Entune package is installed. 2014 models came with a new SR trim and for 2015 models the regular cab model was discontinued.

In November 2016, Toyota USA settled a class action suit over frame rust, agreeing to inspect and if necessary replace rusted frames on 2005–2010 model year Tacomas, 2007–2008 MY Tundras, and 2005–2008 MY Sequoias in the US and its territories.

Technical
The three cab configurations consist of regular cab, access cab, and double cab. The transmissions come in 4-speed automatic, 5-speed automatic, 5-speed manual, and 6-speed manual. The Double Cab model is available with either the short bed, or the long bed, ; other models exclusively use the long bed.

The Tacoma's 4.0-liter 1GR-FE V6 took the place of the original 3.4-liter 5VZ-FE V6. The smaller, but all-new 2.7-liter 2TR-FE four-cylinder alternative in less expensive models is not as powerful, but also consumes fuel less rapidly.

Notes

Models and trims
Toyota also introduced an X-Runner trim, which replaces the slow selling S-Runner trim from the previous generation. The X-Runner features the 1GR-FE paired to a six-speed manual transmission,  alloy wheels, is lowered two inches from the factory and included an X-Brace suspension package. 

Toyota also included a Down-Hill Assist Control (DAC) and Hill-Start Assist Control (HAC), with models that were equipped with the optional TRD Off-Road package. DAC automatically applies braking during downhill descents while HAC prevents the vehicle from rolling backwards on hills. A rear locking differential, or limited-slip differential were also some optional features.

Every Tacoma was manufactured with a composite inner bed that includes a deck rail system with four tie down cleats, hook-pins, and storage boxes. TRD package equipped Tacomas also feature an in-bed 115 V/400 W AC power outlet.

TRD packages
The Tacoma is offered in two TRD packages: Sport and Off-Road. The Sport is targeted more towards improved on-road performance, while the Off-Road is more geared towards the off-road enthusiast. Both are available in 2WD or 4WD, with rear electronic locking differential available only in the Off-Road model. Both variants come with TRD-specific seats, and 400-w AC power inverters mounted in the bed. A TRD supercharger for the 1GR-FE was a dealer-installed option. TRD offered a cold-air intake and cat-back exhaust system through Toyota dealerships. Also available are TRD cosmetic accessories such as aluminum front skid plate, along with shift knobs (A/T and M/T), radiator cap, oil filler cap, and exhaust tip. TRD also sold seat covers for these Tacomas, but only fit the 2005–08 models (09-15 have airbags in the seats, 2005–08 do not).

The TRD Sport package sells in two levels. The first level has a color-matched grille, color-matched front/rear bumpers/door handles/mirrors, and hood with nonfunctional scoop, Bilstein shocks/struts, stainless steel exhaust tip, and aluminum 17-in wheels with 265/65R17 tires. The second level includes the above and adds a towing package (oil and transmission coolers, fan clutch) and heavy-duty high output alternator and battery. The 2005–08 model years came with a mechanical limited-slip differential. The 2009–15 model years have an open differential with a brake-assisted "automatic limited slip" rear differential, similar to a VSC system.

The basic TRD Off-Road package includes none of the color-matched body parts (black door handles/mirrors, chrome bumper/grille). Different from the off-road package, the Technology Package has color-matched body parts, aluminum 16-in wheels, Bilstein shocks, skid plates, and electronic locking rear differential but does not include the hood scoop from the Sport models. The off-road package included certain features that are useful for off-roading, such as those mentioned earlier, while the Technology Package features include A-TRAC (2009–15), Hill Descent assist (automatic transmission only) and Hill Start assist (manual transmission only). Progressive-rate springs are included, and smaller-diameter sway bars compared to the Sport package, which gives the Off-Road more wheel articulation and a smoother ride, but allows for more body roll. The towing package upgrades the battery, alternator, and fan clutch, and includes oil/transmission coolers (same as the Sport). All-terrain tires (265/70R16) and a heavy duty front tow hook complete the package.

TRD Extreme and T/X Baja
From model years 2011 to 2014, the Tacoma was offered in 1500 units of the T/X Baja package. The package includes upgraded lifted suspension with Eibach springs and TRD Bilstein coil-overs at the front and TRD Bilstein reservoir shocks at the rear with an additional leaf spring. The bead-lock style wheels were wrapped in BF Goodrich All-terrain tires. The Baja model also includes a stainless steel TRD exhaust. The iconic Baja shift knob is also available for the six-speed manual transmission models.

TRD Pro

The TRD Pro package was offered for 2015 models. Based on the TRD Off Road, the Pro package added a 2" front lift with Bilstein 2.5-inch front shocks and 2.0-inch rear shocks with remote reservoirs for extra wheel travel, BFGoodrich all-terrain tires on 16-inch black and silver bead-lock-style wheels, and TRD cat-back exhaust system. Cosmetic upgrades included the scooped Sport hood, black badges, blackout lighting elements, a TRD Pro matte-black grille with TOYOTA lettering, and various TRD-badged interior parts. About 1200 TRD Pro Tacomas were made.

Ironman edition
In 2008, an "Ironman" edition was released, named after Ivan "Ironman" Stewart.

X-Runner

The Toyota X-Runner was a limited production sport model. Although it utilizes the standard 4.0L and 6-speed manual from other Tacomas, the X-runner uses lowered double-wishbone suspension, Bilstein shocks and frame x-bracing.

The X-Runner is only available in three colors per year, and only five colors total. For the 2005 to 2008 model years, the X-Runner was available in Speedway Blue, Radiant Red and Black Sand Pearl. 2009 exchanged Radiant Red for Barcelona Red Metallic and Black Sand Pearl for Black. For the 2012 model year facelift, Speedway Blue became Nautical Blue Metallic and then Blue Ribbon Metallic for 2014/2015. The X-Runner was discontinued in the mainland US after the 2013 model year. The X-Runner was last offered in Canada for the 2014 model year and in Hawaii (USA) for the 2014/2015 model years.

Key differences between the X-Runner and the other packages include tweaks to the suspension, hood scoop, ground effects kit, driving lights, sports wheel and tires, and a 3.15 final drive ratio (3.73 for V6 PreRunner and 4X4). Toyota added a rear-mounted X-Brace to stiffen up the rear end (hence the name X-Runner). The chassis was further stiffened by adding two more support braces to the frame. An optional big brake kit by TRD is also available on the X-Runner; which consists of a 332 mm slotted rotor and 4 piston caliper. The BBK (big brake kit) was designed by StopTech.
A factory TRD composite spoiler was also an option but originals are rare. The X-Runner comes only with an Aisin RA60 6-speed manual transmission.

Production numbers are unknown but it is believed roughly 3,000 X-runners were made each model year.

Production
The second generation Tacomas were assembled in Tijuana, Mexico and Fremont, California while the plastic/composite beds were all built in Mexico. After the bankruptcy of GM, GM ended its joint venture with Toyota. Toyota, needing additional production volume at its Texas and Mississippi plants, ended Corolla and Tacoma production at the Fremont plant. In 2010 all Tacoma production was moved to Toyota's Texas plant in San Antonio alongside the Tundra. This brought a total of approximately 1,000 new jobs to San Antonio.

Safety and structural integrity
The Tacoma comes standard with anti-lock brakes, brake assist, and electronic brakeforce distribution. For 2008, a rollover sensor was added which would deploy the side curtain airbags in the event of rollover in Tacomas equipped with the optional side airbags. Beginning with the 2009 model year, all Tacomas feature Toyota's Star Safety System which added Vehicle Stability Control and traction control. Front row side torso airbags and side curtain airbags for both rows also become standard as well as active head restraints.

Given the smaller size of pickup trucks in the Tacoma's category, crash testing for these sized trucks lags with how well most full size trucks perform. However, in an Insurance Institute for Highway Safety (IIHS) test of the Tacoma and other small trucks, only the side airbag equipped Tacoma received the highest overall rating of "Good" in the side impact test. The Tacoma also is rated "Good" in the frontal offset crash test.  In 2009 with the active head restraints the Tacoma is given the IIHS's Top Safety Pick award.

Third generation (N300; 2015) 

The new Tacoma was officially unveiled at the January 2015 North American International Auto Show with United States sales launch following on September 10, 2015. Dimensionally and mechanically, the N300 Tacoma is similar to the preceding N2x0.

Styling
The truck has a new exterior profile taking styling cues from the 2014 model year 4Runner SUV and the 2014 model year Tundra pickup, with a larger grille and new projector-beam headlamps. The tailgate and bed were redesigned and featured a debossed Tacoma logo as well as an infused spoiler. New character lines were also observed on the truck as well as an air dam in front of the vehicle.

The N300 Tacoma is offered in Access Cab and Double Cab configurations with long or short bed sizes. The Regular Cab model was not carried over for the new generation pickup as it was discontinued in 2015.

The interior of the pickup has been changed as well. Using a handlebar theme, Toyota made the interior of the Tacoma more luxurious and added a larger touchscreen display as well as a new instrument panel. Soft-touch materials also replaced the previous generation's hard plastics. A leather option was added. Toyota has also used an acoustic windshield, better insulated doors, as well as more weather stripping to reduce road and wind noise. For the first time Toyota will offer dual climate control in the Tacoma.

Unlike the 2nd generation models, the steering wheel controls in the 2016 and 2017 models had reduced functionality, and therefore impaired convenience when attempting to browse phone Contacts / Favorite Contacts. The steering wheel D-pad controls are no longer linked to the Entune system for the purposes of browsing and selecting contacts. Instead, the driver must rely on voice controls, or must reach over to the center console display and adjust the Entune system through the capacitive touchscreen to browse and select the appropriate contact to place a phone call. Furthermore, D-pad controls no longer offer the ability to scroll through lists of songs during USB or Bluetooth music playback. The driver must use the touch screen to select new albums/artists/songs. These limitations were removed for the 2018 model year onward.

2020 facelift
For the 2020 model year, the Tacoma received a facelift.

In addition to the exterior facelift, there were new added technologies inside. These include Apple CarPlay, Android Auto and Amazon Alexa capability. On the SR5 model and higher, there is a power-adjustable driver's seat and on the Tacoma Limited Double Cab, there's a new Panoramic View Monitor for 360-degree bird's eye views of the truck's immediate surroundings.

Technical
Toyota offers a 2.7-liter I4 engine paired with a 5-speed manual (MY2016-17) or 6-speed automatic transmission, and a 3.5-liter V6 engine paired with a 6-speed manual or 6-speed automatic transmission. The 3.5 V6 can run on a simulated Atkinson cycle using VVT-iW, and feature Toyota's D-4S system which allows it to switch from port injection to direct injection based on driving conditions.

Notes

In addition to this, Toyota updated the truck's frame by adding more high-strength steel in order to increase the truck's rigidity and to drop weight. The body is also constructed using ultra-high-strength steel that was integrated using a new hot stamping process that reduces weight. Toyota also updated the suspensions, rear differentials, and rear axle to improve the truck's road manners while still keeping it off-road capable. 2WD and 4WD models share the same suspension height and ground clearance.

TRD Lift Kit 
In January 2021, the Tacoma TRD Lift Kit was made available as a dealer-installed option for 2020 and newer Tacoma models. The kit includes Bilstein shocks fitted with TRD red dust boots and "Tuned by TRD" graphics. Total frame ground clearance increases by 1.7 inches with the suspension lift kit.

Trims
The truck is available in 6 trim levels: base SR, mid-level SR5, TRD Off-Road, TRD Sport, Limited, and range-topping TRD Pro.

The TRD Off-Road trim models feature an all-new terrain select mode which allows the driver to choose between different types of terrain such as: loose rock, mud, and sand. Toyota also announced a new Crawl mode that will allow the driver to steer the truck in tough terrain while the truck manages braking and acceleration by itself. In addition to this the truck also features a moonroof, keyless entry, Qi Wireless phone charging capability, easy lower tailgate, blind-spot monitoring system, backup camera (standard) and a mounted GoPro holder (standard).

Toyota also introduced a TRD Pro version in late 2016 for the 2017 model year, which comes with FOX-patented Internal Bypass shocks, TRD Pro catback exhaust, TRD Pro skid plate, Rigid Industries LED fog lights, and heritage inspired 'TOYOTA' grille. The 2017 model year TRD Pro was only available in the double cab short bed configuration, with either a manual or automatic gearbox in Barcelona Red Metallic, Super White, or Cement. Black leather with red accents and stitching is the only available interior option. For the 2018 model year TRD Pro, Midnight Black Metallic and Cavalry Blue are new available exterior colors, with Barcelona Red Metallic and Cement discontinued.

Production
The Tacoma's transition to its third generation took place while the segment is growing. In 2014, the San Antonio plant built 105,796 Tacomas and the Baja plant built 71,399 for a total of 177,195. In 2015, the San Antonio plant built 110,911 and Baja built 82,328 for a total of 193,239 built. In 2016, 191,673 Tacomas were sold in the US and Canada (along with 115,489 Tundras also built in San Antonio) and, with the mid size segment up overall, the San Antonio plant was running costlier extra Saturday shifts to keep up with demand, running at 125 percent of projected plant capacity. The 2016 and 2017 model year double-cab short-bed Tacomas are currently made in Tijuana (VINs starting in 3) and all other Tacoma configurations are made in San Antonio (VINs starting in 5). Toyota USA announced it intended to increase production at the Tijuana plant in 2018 from about 100,000 to 160,000 Tacomas.

Gallery

Safety
The 2022 Tacoma was tested by the IIHS:

Toyota Racing Development
In 1998, Toyota added a new Toyota Racing Development (TRD) off-road package. The package includes off-road tires, 16-inch alloy wheels, TRD dampers, a locking rear differential and the TRD graphics.

In 2001, Toyota introduced a TRD sport package on the Tundra full-size pickup. This package was introduced in 2005 for the Tacoma at the same time as the release of the newly redesigned Tacoma.

TRD supercharger
Toyota Racing Development offered a TRD supercharger for the FJ Cruiser and Tacoma equipped with 4.0-liter V6 engine, available through Toyota dealerships. This supercharger was co-developed with Magnuson Superchargers. When installed by a professional dealer, it would not void any warranties on a vehicle.

This all-new TRD supercharger is compatible on all 2005 through 2015 model year Tacoma trucks, and 2007 through 2009 model year FJ Cruiser SUV. This supercharger system features Eaton roots-type rotating components in a one-piece integral manifold, iridium spark plugs, and a five-rib serpentine drive belt system.

When not installed by an authorized dealer, the supercharger is covered by a 12-month,  parts-only warranty. The manufacturer's suggested retail price of the TRD supercharger is $4500, not including installation.

The TRD supercharger program was discontinued for all vehicles, including Tacoma, as of June 2015 due to the expense of development.

Back to the Future Tacoma Concept

On October 21, 2015, Toyota and Universal Pictures celebrated the 30th anniversary of Back to the Future (BTTF) with a Tacoma Concept that was inspired by the original Toyota Pickup that Toyota created for the original film. In the film, the protagonist (Marty McFly) is gifted a black Toyota (Hilux) Pickup SR5 XtraCab 4×4 when he returns to 1985. The Hilux has been modified with extra lights, tubular bumpers, and aftermarket wheels and tires; the popularity of the film has led to numerous recreations of the original concept. The original concept from 1985 was destroyed in a crash, and the studio recreated it for the sequels; after filming was complete, most of the modifications were stripped and the truck was sold to a private owner.

For the 30th anniversary concept, a 2016 Tacoma 4WD was modified to resemble the 1985 original, using the same features and black color paint trim, KC HiLite driving lamps (modified with LED lighting), modified headlights and taillights (matching the 1985 version), the Toyota badging to the truck's tailgate, D-4S fuel injection, and the 1985-inspired mudflaps. The only difference between the 1985 original and the 2016 concept is the tires: Goodyear was featured in the 1985 film, while BF Goodrich is used on the concept.  The concept also did not have a solid front axle like the original 1985 Pickup. Toyota notes that this is a one-off concept as there are no plans to offer it as a package or level trim. The 2016 Tacoma BTTF concept is featured in the launch campaign for the Mirai hydrogen fuel cell vehicle, which includes some of the original actors from the film. The concept was developed by Toyota's marketing arm, with assistance from KMA Promotion.

Sales

References

External links

  Tacoma site

Tacoma

Cars introduced in 1995
2000s cars
2010s cars
2020s cars
Pickup trucks
Rear-wheel-drive vehicles
All-wheel-drive vehicles
Motor vehicles manufactured in the United States